The Government of Delhi, officially the Government of the National Capital Territory of Delhi (GNCTD) is the governing body of the Union Territory of Delhi, whose urban area is the seat of the Government of India. It also governs the city or local governments in the area as per the 74th Constitutional Amendment Act.

Union Territories are governed by the Union Government. There are a few exceptions, such as Delhi and Puducherry which also have their own elected governments with some limitations.

Through the highly controversial GNCTD Amendment Act, 2021, the Union Government mandated primacy to the centrally appointed Lieutenant Governor and made the elected government subsidiary.

Local governments 
The local or city government is headed by the mayor. The Municipal Corporation of Delhi handled civic administration for the city, and had one mayor.

The Municipal Corporation of Delhi was trifurcated into three bodies, the North Delhi Municipal Corporation, the South Delhi Municipal Corporation and the East Delhi Municipal Corporation in 2012. But then, they were reunified on 22 May 2022.

The Delhi Cantonment Board is also a municipality that has jurisdiction in the city, since cantonment boards are municipalities as per the Cantonment Board Act 2006 and are under control of the Ministry of Defence.

Government of NCT of Delhi 
The Chief Minister and lieutenant Governor are the heads of the Government. The government consists of the legislative wing, i.e. the present Legislative Assembly of Delhi, which is unicameral, consisting of 70 members of the legislative assembly.

History 

The Legislative Assembly of Delhi was first constituted on 17 March 1952 under the Government of Part C States Act, 1951, but it was abolished on 1 October 1956. Its legislative assembly was re-established in the year of 1993, after the Constitution (Sixty-ninth Amendment) Act, 1991 came into force, followed by the Government of National Capital Territory of Delhi Act, 2021 the Sixty-ninth Amendment to the Constitution of India, declared the Union Territory of Delhi to be formally known as National Capital Territory of Delhi.

The first chief minister of Delhi was Ch. Braham Prakash (INC) and the first woman CM was Sushma Swaraj of BJP. Sheila Dikshit (INC) has been the chief minister for the maximum times (three) and oversaw immense development of the city during her tenure. Guru Radha Kishan (CPI) had the rare distinction of representing his constituency in the Municipal Corporation of Delhi for most years continuously by an individual and Ch. Prem Singh (INC) has won the maximum elections for different civic bodies in Delhi.

Ministers 

As per article 239AA of Indian Constitution, the number of ministers cannot exceed ten percent of Delhi assembly seats. Therefore, there can be a maximum of seven m Ministers (10% of 70 Delhi assembly seats).

Central government 

The Lieutenant Governor of Delhi is appointed by the President of India., as agent of President and head of state like governor, on the advice of the Central government. This state government is called the Government of the National Capital Territory of Delhi (Government of NCT of Delhi or simply Government of Delhi). It consists of an executive, led by the Lieutenant Governor of Delhi, a judiciary and a legislature.

Central versus State 
The Supreme Court of India in Government of NCT of Delhi v. Union of India ruled that according to the Article 239AA of the Indian constitution, that although the government had to keep him/her informed of its decisions, Delhi's lieutenant governor did not have any independent decision-making powers and had to follow the "aid and advice" of the chief minister-led council of ministers of the Government of Delhi on matters which the Delhi Legislative Assembly could legislate on, viz., all items on the State List (items on which only state legislatures can legislate) and the Concurrent List (items on which both the Parliament of India and the state legislatures can legislate) barring 'police, 'public order' and 'land'. The court added that on matters referred to him/her, the LG was bound to follow the orders of the president.

Judiciary 
The Delhi High Court has jurisdiction over Delhi, which also has two types of lower courts: the Small Causes Court for civil cases, and the Sessions Court for criminal cases. Like other Union territories, the Delhi Police reports to the Ministry of Home Affairs, Government of India and not the government of NCT of Delhi. Headed by the Police Commissioner, it is one of the largest metropolitan police forces in the world. The headquarters of Delhi Police are located Jai Singh Marg, Connaught Place, New Delhi.

See also
 First Legislative Assembly of Delhi
 Second Legislative Assembly of Delhi
 Third Legislative Assembly of Delhi
 Fourth Legislative Assembly of Delhi
 Fifth Legislative Assembly of Delhi
 Sixth Legislative Assembly of Delhi
 Seventh Legislative Assembly of Delhi

References

External links
 

Government of Delhi